Renato João Inácio Margaça (born 17 July 1985) is a professional footballer who plays for Nea Salamis Famagusta FC. Mainly a midfielder, he can also operate as a left-back.

Club career
Born in Covilhã, Margaça's input at the professional level in his country consisted of six Segunda Liga games with F.C. Alverca in 2004–05. At the end of the season the club folded, and he went on to resume his career in the lower leagues.

In the summer of 2008, Margaça moved to the Cypriot First Division where he remained more than one decade. He started out at Doxa Katokopias FC, signing with AEK Larnaca FC two years later.

On 8 July 2017, six years after arriving there, the 32-year-old Margaça renewed his contract with AC Omonia until June 2020.

International career
At youth level, Margaça earned 11 caps for Portugal. On 17 March 2017, after being awarded the country's citizenship, he was called up to the Cyprus national team, making his debut five days later in a 3–1 friendly win over Kazakhstan where he was involved in two of the goals.

Club statistics

Honours
Omonia
Cypriot Cup: 2011–12
Cypriot Super Cup: 2012

References

External links

1985 births
Living people
People from Covilhã
Cypriot people of Portuguese descent
Portuguese emigrants to Cyprus
Sportspeople from Castelo Branco District
Portuguese footballers
Cypriot footballers
Association football defenders
Association football midfielders
Liga Portugal 2 players
Segunda Divisão players
F.C. Alverca players
C.D. Fátima players
S.C.U. Torreense players
C.D. Mafra players
Cypriot First Division players
Cypriot Second Division players
Doxa Katokopias FC players
AEK Larnaca FC players
AC Omonia players
Nea Salamis Famagusta FC players
Anorthosis Famagusta F.C. players
Portugal youth international footballers
Cyprus international footballers
Portuguese expatriate footballers
Expatriate footballers in Cyprus
Portuguese expatriate sportspeople in Cyprus